Perry Lamar Williams (born May 12, 1961 in Hamlet, North Carolina) is a former American football cornerback in the National Football League. He was drafted by the New York Giants in the seventh round of the 1983 NFL Draft. He played for the Giants from 1984 to 1993.  He played college football and ran track at North Carolina State. He held the 55m indoor track record in 1983 with a time of 6.22 seconds. 

Together with George Martin, Williams is an alum of Fairleigh Dickinson University-Florham (BA 1987), as the first two Giants players to graduate from the school's NFL degree completion program. He works at Long Island University Post (LIU) as the Director of Sports Management.
 
Williams won two Super Bowls with the Giants.

References

1961 births
Living people
Fairleigh Dickinson University alumni
People from Passaic County, New Jersey
American football cornerbacks
NC State Wolfpack football players
New York Giants players
People from Hamlet, North Carolina